Hydroxydehydroepiandrosterone may refer to:

 7α-Hydroxydehydroepiandrosterone
 7β-Hydroxydehydroepiandrosterone
 15α-Hydroxydehydroepiandrosterone
 16α-Hydroxydehydroepiandrosterone